Hangin' Tough is an album by American country music artist Waylon Jennings, released on MCA Records in 1987.

Recording and composition
Jennings, who fought RCA and the Nashville system tooth and nail to gain control over his music in the early seventies, actively sought out Music Row's most commercial songwriters for Hangin' Tough, which was produced by Jennings and Jimmy Bowen.  Like his previous album Will the Wolf Survive, it displays a slicker sound typical of the records coming out of Nashville in the mid-1980s, utilizing synthesizers and digital recording, but Jennings vocal style on the LP, which AllMusic describes as "stout and unflappable," carries off the songs with conviction.  "Rose in Paradise," written by Jim McBride and Stewart Harris, was released in January 1987 as the first single from the album and became Jennings' twelfth number one country single, remaining there for one week and spending a total of nineteen weeks on the country chart.  The song tells the story of a wealthy, jealous banker from Macon who keeps his wife a virtual prisoner in his mansion. The woman ends up cheating on him with the gardener, causing him to kill both and bury them in the garden under a rose bush.  A second single, "Fallin' Out," a song about a troubled marriage, reached #8.  Hangin' Tough also displays Jennings' fondness for digressing beyond the country format.  "Chevy Van," which had been a hit single for Sammy Johns in 1973, details how an unnamed male driver picks up an unnamed female, who then proceeds to eventually seduce him into a one-night stand in the back of his Chevrolet Van.  At the end he drops her off "in a town that was so small, you could throw a rock from end to end. A dirt road main street, she walked off in bare feet", and laments "It's a shame I won't be passing through again."  Jennings looks back to the seventies again with his reading of Gerry Rafferty's 1978 hit "Baker Street," which opens the album and substitutes a bluesy, Eric Clapton-sounding guitar solo for the original's famous saxophone tag line.  Another interesting song choice is "Defying Gravity (The Executioner's Song)" written by  cult hero Jesse Winchester.

Jennings, who was only recently drug-free at the time of the sessions, later expressed disappointment with the album and his performance:  "After I signed with MCA, we gave it out best shot, through a couple of albums...On Will the Wolf Survive? and Hangin' Tough, it was like I was off in a corner of a separate room, clouded by delay, distanced.  I wasn't leading the band.  I was trying to get my feet back on the ground, and that took as much concentration as singing.  Though I was off drugs, I was still smoking heavily, and my voice showed the wear and tear."

Reception
Hangin' Tough, Jennings second release on MCA, peaked at #19 on the Billboard country albums chart, which was starting to be dominated by a new generation of younger country singers like Randy Travis.  AllMusic: "Waylon perfectly articulates a unique romantic dilemma in 'I Can't Help the Way I Don't Feel About You,' emphasizing the irony of the situation...Perhaps most impressive, though, is the unguarded melancholy so eloquently expressed in the quietly heartbreaking 'Crying Don't Even Come Close.'  Hangin' Tough isn't a definitive Waylon album, but it will reveal its share of diamonds in the rough to hardcore fans."

Track listing

"Baker Street" (Gerry Rafferty) – 4:33
"I Can't Help the Way I Don't Feel About You" (Chris Waters, Michael Garvin, Tom Shapiro) – 4:21
"Rose in Paradise" (Jim McBride, Stewart Harris) – 3:42
"Crying Don't Even Come Close" (Steve Gillette, Charles J. Cuarto) – 2:28
"Chevy Van" (Sammy Johns) – 3:06
"Fallin' Out" (Denny Lile) – 3:35
"Deep in the West" (Shake Russell) – 3:58
"Between Fathers and Sons" (Gary Nicholson, John Barlow Jarvis) – 3:18
"The Crown Prince" (Roger Murrah, Jim McBride) – 4:08
"Defying Gravity (Executioner's Song)" (Jesse Winchester) – 3:31

Personnel
Waylon Jennings - lead and backing vocals
Richard Bennett - acoustic guitar
Matt Betton - drums
Jerry Bridges - bass guitar
Larry Byrom - electric guitar
John Jarvis - piano, synthesizer
Ralph Mooney - steel guitar
Mark O'Connor - mandola, mandolin
Steve Schaffer - synclavier
Gary Scruggs - electric guitar, acoustic guitar
Billy Joe Walker, Jr. - electric guitar, acoustic guitar
Curtis "Mr. Harmony" Young - background vocals
Reggie Young - electric guitar

Chart performance

References

Waylon Jennings albums
1987 albums
MCA Records albums
Albums produced by Jimmy Bowen